True Friends (Russian: Верные друзья) is a 1954 dramatic comedy film directed by Mikhail Kalatozov.

Plot
Alexander, Boris and Vasily are three old friends, who now barely see each other as they are busy with their professional life. They embark on long-planned voyage on a raft down the Yauza river, which turns into a series of comical accidents but also strengthens their friendship.

Cast
Vasili Merkuryev as Vasili Nestratov
Boris Chirkov as Boris Chizhov
Aleksandr Borisov as Alexander Lapin
Alexey Gribov as Nekhoda
Liliya Gritsenko as Natalya Sergeyevna
Lyudmila Shagalova as Katya
Aleksei Pokrovsky
Ludmila Genika-Chirkova
Mikhail Pugovkin as club entertainer

Production
True Friends was made in the aftermath of the death of Joseph Stalin, when political control over Soviet cinema relaxed considerably. Josephin Woll wrote that "his death liberated director Kalatozov... True Friends was his first Thaw project." Its script was submitted for approval in 1952, but it was only authorized for filming after Stalin's passing away.

Reception
With 30.9 million tickets sold, True Friends was the seventh highest-grossing Soviet film of 1954. Together with Salt of the Earth, it was Ex aequo awarded the Crystal Globe in the 1954 Karlovy Vary International Film Festival.

The New York Times critic wrote that the film "makes for a surprisingly relaxed and sometimes infectious adventure." Mira and Antonin Liehm commented that "it is almost incredible how fresh and new this film seemed, with its tame satirical theme." John Wakeman regarded it as a "subtle and often very funny satire". David C. Gillespie opined that it is "an important, largely successful attempt... in addressing the legacy of Stalinism and its effects on the psyche and behaviour of people." Josephine Woll concluded that True Friends "broke little new ground", reflecting the slow start of the Thaw in 1954, but that it satisfied the audience's "hunger" for films that, "banal plot and schematic characters notwithstanding, portrayed their life with some veracity."

References

External links
True Friends on the IMDb.
True Friends on kino-teatr.ru.
True Friends on kinoros.ru.
True Friends the film with English subtitles

1954 films
Soviet comedy-drama films
Russian comedy-drama films
1950s Russian-language films
Mosfilm films
Films directed by Mikhail Kalatozov
Crystal Globe winners
1954 comedy-drama films
Films scored by Tikhon Khrennikov